Tyrell Vernon (born September 8, 1988) is a Canadian professional basketball player who last played for the Mississauga Power of the National Basketball League of Canada (NBL). He played at the collegiate level with McMaster University and then St. Francis Xavier University and was one of the top passers and shooters in the Atlantic University Sport association while with the latter team. Vernon primarily plays the point guard position and stands 6 ft 1 in (1.85 m).

Professional career 
On July 28, 2014, it was announced that the Mississauga Power had signed Vernon for their upcoming season. He said, "I'm very excited to be joining the Power." Vernon had grown up with the team's assistant coach, Jeremie Kayeye, and addressed the fact by saying, "We have a lot of respect for each other and I'm already very comfortable with the staff."

References 

Living people
1988 births
Point guards
Sportspeople from Hamilton, Ontario
McMaster University alumni
St. Francis Xavier University alumni
Mississauga Power players
Canadian men's basketball players